Mahlau is a surname. Notable people with the surname include:
 Alfred Mahlau (1894–1967), German painter, graphic artist, professor
 Hans Mahlau (born 1900), German actor

References

German-language surnames